Brongwyn is a hamlet in the community of Beulah, Ceredigion, Wales, which is 69.5 miles (111.9 km) from Cardiff and 190.7 miles (306.9 km) from London. Brongwyn is represented in the Senedd by Elin Jones (Plaid Cymru) and is part of the Ceredigion constituency in the House of Commons.

Etymology 
The word derives from the Welsh language: "White meadows".

References

See also 
 High Sheriff of Montgomeryshire - 1838: Martin Williams, of Brongwyn
 List of localities in Wales by population 

Villages in Ceredigion